The American Epilepsy Society (AES) is a nationwide 501(c)(3) non-profit organization for medical professionals and scientific investigators dedicated to finding the prevention, treatment, and cure of epilepsy.

History 
AES was founded in 1946 as the American Branch of the International League Against Epilepsy (ILAE), and is one of the oldest neurological foundations in the United States. In 1954, it formally adopted its current name.

Publications 
AES publishes Epilepsy Currents, a journal that provides commentary and reviews on the latest epilepsy research.

Conferences 

AES hosts an annual meeting. Workshops, poster sessions, and speakers cover topics of clinical care, translational science, and basic science as it relates to epilepsy.

Awards 
The American Epilepsy Society confers several awards to recognize members and groups within the community for their excellence in research and medicine as well as their dedicated efforts on behalf of the Society. The AES gives five awards:

 Founders Award
 Distinguished Service Award
 J. Kiffin Penry Award for Excellence in Epilepsy Care
 Basic Science Research Recognition Award
 Clinical Science Research Recognition Award

References

External links
 

Organizations established in 1946
Health charities in the United States
Charities based in Illinois